Breathe In is the debut studio album by the British pop singer-songwriter Lucie Silvas, released by Mercury Records on 11 October 2004 in the United Kingdom. It was released in the Netherlands on 29 March 2005 and worldwide in April 2006.

The majority of the album was co-written by Silvas with Graham Kearns and  Judie Tzuke  whom Silvas had previously been a backing singer for. The album also features a cover of Metallica's song "Nothing Else Matters" which was released as a single in Europe.

Singles 
 The first single from the album was "What You're Made Of", which charted at No. 7 in the UK Singles Chart.
 "Breathe In" was the second single from the album, and is Silvas' highest charting UK single to date, peaking at No. 6.
 "The Game Is Won" was the third single, released in May 2005, which peaked at No. 38.
 The fourth single was "Don't Look Back", and it charted at No. 34. It shares its artwork and b-sides with "Nothing Else Matters".
 The fifth and final UK single was "Forget Me Not", a rerecording of an old song from Silvas' first unreleased album of the same name. The single failed to reach the UK Top 100.
 The final European single was "Nothing Else Matters", a cover of a Metallica song. It achieved success in the Netherlands, charting at No. 13. The cover and b-sides were the same as that of "Don't Look Back" in the UK.

Track listings

B-sides

Credits 
 Art direction – David Coffin
 Art producer – David Coffin
 Bass – Paul Turner
 Cello – Anthony Pleeth
 Conductor – Nick Ingham
 Digital editing – Keith Gary
 Drums – Charlie Russell – Lee Davies
 Engineer – Martin Hayles
 Engineer Assisting- Dan Gautreau
 Executive producer – Michael Peden, Matt Jagger
 Guitars - Graham Kearns
 Mastering – Greg Calbi
 Mixing – Michael Brauer, Keith Gary
 Orchestra contractor – Isobel Griffiths
 Orchestra leader – Gavyn Wright
 Percussion – Ian Stoddart
 Photography – Tony Duran, Simon Fowler
 Keyboards - Peter Gordeno
 Piano – Lucie Silvas
 Producer – Michael Peden
 Programming – Charlie Russell
 String Arrangements – Nick Ingman
 Vocals – Lucie Silvas
 Vocals (Background) – Lucie Silvas, "The London Community Gospel Choir"

Chart and certifications

Weekly charts

Year-end charts

Certifications and sales

References 

Lucie Silvas albums
2004 debut albums
2005 albums
Albums produced by Mike Peden
Albums with cover art by Tony Duran